John Lee Hooker Jr. (born 1952) is an American blues musician. He is the son of influential blues singer John Lee Hooker (1917–2001). The younger Hooker's musical style is markedly modernized, featuring contemporary arrangements.

Born in Detroit, Michigan, United States, Hooker was performing live on local radio stations by the time he was eight years old, and toured with his father as a teenager.  He struggled with drugs and alcohol for several years before reviving his career with his debut solo album, Blues with a Vengeance, in 2004.  The album was nominated for a Grammy Award.  A follow-up album, Cold as Ice, was released in 2006.

Hooker's third album, All Odds Against Me, was released on August 19, 2008.  Marking a clear departure from his father's style of music, the album was nominated for a Grammy Award that year in the Best Traditional Blues CD category.  An animated video for the song, "Blues Ain't Nothin' But a Pimp," produced by Paris-based studio Callicore, featured Hooker as a street-hardened character known as "Bluesman."  The video was a 2009 Webby Award honoree for special effects.

Hooker's 2008 touring band included of George Lacson (bass), Jeff Horan (guitar), Mike Rogers (drums), and Gig Anderson (keyboards).

Now an ordained minister, he is now reaching out to those in prisons (some of which were where he was an inmate during his drug abuse years) and is currently raising funds through his Kickstarter webpage in order to finish his recording and eventual release of his first contemporary soul gospel album using almost the same blues and funk elements he incorporated in his blues releases and concerts. Rev. Hooker also gives a brief video bio of himself leading up to his conversion to Christianity on his Kickstarter page including a full bio.

Before becoming a minister and still a blues artist, he was featured in an episode of The 700 Club where he detailed his drug addictions and imprisonments leading up to his conversion to Christianity and sobriety. That video clip can be found on YouTube.

Discography

Studio albums
 Blues With A Vengeance (Kent Music/Kent Entertainment Group, 2004)
 Cold As Ice (Telarc Records, 2006)
 All Odds Against Me (Steppin' Stone Records/CC Entertainment, 2008)
 All Hooked Up (Steppin' Stone Records/CC Entertainment, 2012)
 That's What The Blues Is All About [with Daddy's Cash] (Sound And More Studios/Hermes Management, 2012)
 Testify (Steppin' Stone Records/CC Entertainment, 2020)

Live albums
 Live In Istanbul, Turkey (Steppin' Stone Records/CC Entertainment, 2010)

References

External links
Official Site of John Lee Hooker Jr.
John Lee Hooker Jr interview at Absenta Musical
John Lee Hooker Jr interview at Artist Connection Podcast

American blues singers
Living people
1952 births
Musicians from Detroit